Anton Nikolayevich Kapustin (born November 10, 1971, Moscow) is a Russian-American theoretical physicist and the Earle C. Anthony Professor of Theoretical Physics at the California Institute of Technology. His interests lie in quantum field theory and string theory, and their applications to particle physics and condensed matter theory. He is the son of the pianist-composer Nikolai Kapustin.

Education 
Kapustin obtained a B.S. in physics from Moscow State University in 1993. He received a Ph.D. in physics from the California Institute of Technology in 1997 with John Preskill as his advisor.

Research 
He has made several contributions to dualities and other aspects of quantum field theories, in particular topological field theories and supersymmetric gauge theories. With Edward Witten he discovered deep connections between the S-duality of supersymmetric gauge theories and the geometric Langlands correspondence. In recent years, he has focused on mathematical structures in and classification schemes of topological field theories and symmetry-protected topological phases.

References

External links
Homepage

Living people
California Institute of Technology faculty
Mathematical physicists
American string theorists
1971 births
Soviet physicists
20th-century American physicists
Russian physicists
Simons Investigator